William Harrington, commonly known as Bill Harrington, was an Irish footballer who played as a goalkeeper and made five appearances for the FAI-organised Ireland national team.

Career
Harrington made his international debut for the Irish Free State on 8 December 1935 in a friendly match against the Netherlands, which finished as a 3–5 loss. He went on to make five appearances for the team, earning his final cap on 22 May 1938 against Poland as a 69th-minute substitute for George McKenzie, which finished as a 0–6 loss.

Career statistics

International

References

External links
 
 

Year of birth missing
Year of death missing
Republic of Ireland association footballers
Irish Free State international footballers
Ireland (FAI) international footballers
Irish Free State association footballers
Association football goalkeepers
Cork City F.C. players
Cork City F.C. (1938–1940) players
League of Ireland players